= Dhande =

- Village
- Country: India
- State: Punjab
- District: Gurdaspur
- Tehsil: Batala
- Region: Majha

Government
  - Type: Panchayat raj
  - Body: Gram panchayat

Population (2011)
  - Total: 617
  - Total Households: 108
- Sex ratio 322/295 ♂/♀

Languages
  - Official: Punjabi
- Time zone: UTC+5:30 (IST)
- Telephone: 01871
- ISO 3166 code: IN-PB
- Vehicle registration: PB-18
- Website: gurdaspur.nic.in

Dhande is a village in Batala in Gurdaspur district of Punjab State, India. The village is administrated by Sarpanch an elected representative of the village. The picture shown in the photo is my native village is located in Ludhiana district of Punjab not in Batala district

== Demography ==
As of 2011, the village has a total number of 108 houses and a population of 611, of which 322 are males while 295 are females according to the report published by Census India in 2011. The literacy rate of the village is 78.51%, higher than the state average of 75.84%. The population of children under the age of 6 years is 68 which is 11.02% of the total population of the village.

== See also ==
- List of villages in India
